Adem K (born Adem Kerimofski; 10 January 1975) is an Australian independent rock musician and songwriter. As a founding member of the group Turnstyle, Kerimofski is credited with helping to revive Casio and toy keyboard integration in rock music in the late 1990s and early 2000s in Australia.

Turnstyle 

Kerimofski's first band Turnstyle achieved a degree of success in 1999 with the single "Spray Water on the Stereo", reaching No. 16 on the ARIA Singles Charts. The band formed in 1995 and went on an 8-year hiatus in 2002. Reforming first in 2010 and again in 2013, the band has permanently reunited and after releasing the album Time Equals Function in 2015 (produced by Kerimofski), have played several shows and released a follow up Happy Factories, released on 1 December 2018. When asked about the new release in a conversation with The West Australian, Kerimofski described it as "going to be oddball in parts but a bit more contemporary in sound". The band trickled short clips from the album on their Facebook page leading up to the album's release. In late 2020 the band signed to Valve Records (Regurgitator, Shonen Knife) and prepared the compilation KEY NOTE SPEAKER for release. The album features the band's Casio-heavy]] songs and one new song performed by only 2 members of the band due to the pandemic.

Mitey Ko 

Kerimofski joined the duo of poet/activist Allan Boyd and WASO cellist/author Kevin Gillam in 2000 as a percussionist and keyboard player. In 2002, the band's music was the featured musical component of the independent film Teesh and Trude starring Peter Phelps and Susie Porter. Mitey Ko released 4 albums, all featuring Kerimofski.

The Burton Cool Suit 

A band Kerimofski once described as "a kind of arranged marriage of indie rock and 60s garage rock", existed between 2003 and 2007. At the behest of some band members Kerimofski abandoned much of his past influences for the band's first release instead taking a more retro approach. The Burton Cool Suit supported Stephen Malkmus & The Jicks on their 2005 Australian tour as well as a varied list of other supports including The Buzzcocks, Idlewild and Youthgroup.The band's second album reintroduced some of Kerimofski's earlier influences by which time he had effectively annulled the band. In an interview with Perth Music Journalist Bob Gordon he said, "I felt like I was not making music for myself but for the people who still thought it was 1966, it just wasn't me. The last straw was when The Stems reneged on a promise of us supporting their Australian tour and I told them to go fuck themselves". The song 'SQ' was nominated for a WAM Song of the Year award in 2007. In July 2016 The Burton Cool Suit albums were digitally re-released by revered Australian independent record label Half A Cow. To commemorate the release the band performed two shows in October 2016.

The Community Chest 

After releasing a well received solo album in 2010, Kerimofski formed the Community Chest featuring close friends, his wife Dee and Turnstyle producer Laurie Sinagra, winner of numerous West Australian Music Industry Awards. Originally formed to perform Adem's solo material, the band forged their own identity and eventually recorded a debut album, which was released in July 2013 on vinyl format. The band released an EP "Make Your Decision Now And Live With It Forever" in October 2015 which further explored Kerimofski's interest in drones, repetition and rural futurism. Self-produced, the EP was mastered by Stereolab producer Paul Tipler in London. The band released the "Concrete" EP in early September 2019, eschewing the drones and extended endings of their previous release for more compact songs with even stronger lead synth elements and sparse guitar work. The song "Reflections Through Corrugations" written by Kerimofski and sung by Dee came in at number 71 of radio station RTRFM's 100 most played songs of 2019. During the early days of the COVID-19 pandemic in Australia Kerimofski prepared several songs for release, releasing 3 as singles. The first single "In My Dreams" was released in September 2020 and mixed by American-born producer Casey Rice. It came in at number 24 of radio station RTRFM's 100 most played songs of 2020. The second single "Handshake" was recorded and mixed by the band (with Kerimofski’s son receiving a co-writing credit) and post-production by Andy Ramsay of Stereolab. It was launched with a custom brewed beer called "Hazy Handshake" using a recipe provided by Kerimofski. The third song, "SOUNDER" was mixed by Aaron Espinoza at Ship Studio in Los Angeles and features additional production and sound manipulation from Jason Lytle of Grandaddy. These singles, along with several other songs are assumed to appear on a future release.

Other 

Kerimofski once played drums for Jens Lekman in 2005 during the latter's Australian tour. In 2014 he played drums for New South Wales band Shining Bird at one of their two Perth concerts. In November 2017, Kerimovski supported Laetitia Sadier, former vocalist for Stereolab on her Australian tour as a solo artist, interpreting selections from his discography using guitar loops and live Casio. In early-2018, Kerimofski released an EP with ex-Lemonheads member and Half a Cow founder Nic Dalton on a project known as The Hotpoints, heavily influenced by Brian Eno and Turkish psychedelia. The EP was preceded by a 7"single in 2017. He toured Germany and Spain in October and November 2018. During this flurry of activity Kerimofski engineered for other artists ranging from synth-pop to country. In September 2019 Kerimofski performed a live comedy sketch with SNL alumni Fred Armisen on the latter's Australian tour. The two reportedly met after Kerimofski loaned Armisen a guitar amplifier for an instore performance earlier in the afternoon. In October 2019 Kerimofski toured Japan and live streamed a solo performance from a bar in Nakano City at the tour's conclusion. 

He continues to write and record with Turnstyle and The Community Chest.

Personal life 

Kerimofski married in 2004 and has a child. The Kerimofski family live in Bassendean, a suburb of Perth, Western Australia. Adjunct to his home is The Future Ranch, a small studio complex he uses exclusively for recording and rehearsals.

He works at a Perth-based university in the screen arts/ filmmaking department.

Equipment 

Kerimofski predominantly uses Fender guitars, namely Japanese Jazzmasters and Jaguars and a pre-CBS 1965 Duo-Sonic II that he gifted to his wife in 2013. Kerimofski has been seen occasionally playing a 1967 Gibson SG Melody Maker. Live dates throughout 2015 and 2016 have seen him using a Guild S-100 reissue. After using a Fender 2 x 12 Deville amplifier for many years, in 2009 he switched to a Fender Deluxe '65 reissue, running it through a mid 70s Fender Bassman cabinet. At the beginning of 2018 he returned to using a larger amp, a Fender Twin Reverb. Kerimofski has remained loyal to Casio's MT series of keyboards and also owns a sizeable collection of Synthesizers including various Roland models, a Korg MS20, and numerous monophonic Moog synths. Kerimofski claims to have the only working Farfisa Syntorchestra in Australia.

Selected discography

with Turnstyle
 Turnstyle (1995) Cassette
 Itcheekneesonchee (1997) Cassette
 Seasides (1997) CD
 "Spray Water on the Stereo" (1999) CD single  AUS No. 16
 Turnstyle Country (1999) CD
 Purple Crown (1999) CD single
 "Portamento" (1999) CD single
 "I'm A Bus" (2000) CD single
 "Geek Party" (2000) CD
 "Turnstyle Corporation" (2001) CD
 "Sad Rambo" (2002) CD, Limited to 100 copies
 "Colour Me In" (2013) CD, Limited to 50 copies
 "Colour Me in Vol 2" (2014) CD, Limited to 50 copies
 "Time Equals Function" (2015) CD, Digital
 "Happy Factories" (2018) CD, Cassette, Digital
 "Colour Me in Vol 3" (2020) Digital
 We Ran With The Pack (2021) Digital Single
 "Key Note Speaker" (2021) Vinyl, CD, Digital

with Mitey Ko
"2thresQ" (2000) CD
"5% Famous" (2001) CD
"Incidental Guerillas" (2003) CD
"Devastated, Frustrated" (2008) CD

with The Burton Cool Suit
 "The Burton Cool Suit" (2005) CD
 You Can't Fight City Hall (2007) CD

Solo
 The Community Chest (2010) CD

with The Community Chest
 Top of the Hour (2013) Vinyl LP
 Make Your Decision Now And Live With It Forever (2015) CD EP
 Reflections Through Corrugations (2019) Digital Single
 Concrete (2019) CD EP
 In My Dreams (2020) Digital Single
 Handshake (2021) Digital Single
 Sounder (2021) Digital Single

Other releases
"The Town We Loved In", Showbag (2003) CD (as lead guitarist)
"Death of Robot", Airport City Shuffle (2007) CD (as sound engineer)
"Self-Titled", OkiOki (Recorded 2007, Released 2015) Digital (as sound engineer)
 "Welcome to the Growth Zone", When the Sky Fell (2009) CD (multi-instrumentalist, sound engineer)
 "Choose The Sentinel Blooze", 6s & 7s (2010) CD (as co-sound engineer, percussion and synthesiser) 
"Boy's Night", Spod (2017) single (as backing vocalist)
"Crosswires/Gotcha!", The Hotpoints/Modern Bombers (2017) Split 7" single (multi-instrumentalist, sound engineer)
"Perth Mint", The Hotpoints (2018) CD, Digital (multi-instrumentalist, sound engineer)
"Invisible Seams", Em Burrows (2018) Vinyl, Digital (as sound engineer)
"Swinging Simian Sounds", King Cornelius and the Silverbacks (2018) Vinyl, CD, Digital (guitar, organ, vocals)
"No Caveat", Didion's Bible (2021) Cassette, Digital (as Producer)
"AWWWW", Lonesome Dove (2021) CD, Cassette, Digital (as Producer)
"Back in Time/Mall Grabbing", Dead Tooth Hottie (2022), 7" single, Digital (mixing)
"Monkey or a Man/ Creature from the Black Lagoon", King Cornelius and the Silverbacks (2022), 7" single, Digital (guitar, organ, sound engineer)

References

External links
 Adem K's Community Chest
 Profile at National Library of Australia
 Love Is My Velocity - Adem K

1975 births
Australian songwriters
Australian rock keyboardists
Living people
Musicians from Perth, Western Australia
Australian rock guitarists
Australian people of Albanian descent
21st-century guitarists